Alexandra Huntingdon Tydings is an American actress, director, writer, producer, and activist, best known for her role as Greek goddess Aphrodite on the television series Hercules: The Legendary Journeys and its spin-off, Xena: Warrior Princess.

Personal life 
Alexandra Tydings was born in Washington, D.C. She has four sisters and one brother, and is the daughter of former Maryland U.S. Senator Joseph Tydings and his second wife, Terry Lynn Huntingdon Tydings and the granddaughter of former Maryland U.S. Senator Millard Tydings. She is a graduate of Sidwell Friends School and Brown University, with a degree in film and critical theory. She speaks English, French and Spanish.

Tydings counts Katharine Hepburn and Kevin Spacey among her favorite actors, and as she told Whoosh.org, she most enjoys the research and collaborating process of acting; auditioning is her least favorite part of theater arts. She competed in Irish dancing as a child, and performed with The Royal Ballet of London at the Kennedy Center. Dance led to performance of all kinds; in addition to acting, she was the singer and bassist of bands Annabelle Kickbox and She's Seen You Naked.

Whoosh.org points out that Tydings maintained a vegetarian diet for 14 years, and that she enjoys gardening.

Career 
After graduating from Brown University, Tydings moved to Hollywood to pursue an acting career. In her first major feature film, she played opposite Woody Harrelson in Oscar winner Michael Cimino's The Sunchaser, which premiered at the Cannes Film Festival.  She has since performed in dozens of roles in film, television and theater, including six years as a series regular on Xena: Warrior Princess and Hercules: The Legendary Journeys.

In 2015, Tydings wrote and directed The Trial of Hanna Porn,  a multi-media piece on abortion, which won the Best of Fringe award at the Charm City Fringe Festival. She then went on to write, direct and produce Rainbow Bridge, an independent film about two women advocating for abortion in the United States.

Filmography

References

External links

Actresses from Washington, D.C.
American television actresses
American film actresses
Brown University alumni
Living people
20th-century American actresses
21st-century American actresses
Year of birth missing (living people)